"49 Percent" is the second single from Norwegian duo Röyksopp's second album, The Understanding (2005). It features the vocals and lyrics of Chelonis R. Jones. The song initially was written as "Don't Give Up" and sung in live shows, then was developed into "49 Percent" and "Don't Give Up" was covered by the band The Whitest Boy Alive.

Release
The single was released on 26 September 2005 in the United Kingdom. It reached number 55 on the UK Singles Chart.

Track listing
 "49 Percent (Radio Edit)" – 3:33
 "49 Percent (Angello & Ingrosso Remix)" – 9:18
 "Curves" – 4:59

Charts

References

2005 singles
2005 songs
Astralwerks singles
Röyksopp songs
Songs written by Svein Berge
Songs written by Torbjørn Brundtland
Song recordings produced by Sebastian Ingrosso
Song recordings produced by Steve Angello